Calum MacDonald  (Scottish Gaelic: Calum Dòmhnallach /kalˠəm dɔ̃ːnəlˠəx/; born 12 November 1953) is a musician who was a founder member of, and percussionist in, the Scottish Celtic rock band Runrig, as well as their primary songwriter with his older brother, Rory MacDonald from 1973 to 2018. Generally, Rory wrote the melodies, and Calum the lyrics.

Early life
His brother Rory was born in Dornoch, Sutherland. His father, Donald John MacDonald of North Uist, was a World War II veteran. The family moved to North Uist, when Rory was about four years old. Calum MacDonald himself was born in Lochmaddy, North Uist.

When the time came for Rory to attend High School, which at the time was situated in Portree, on the Isle of Skye, the whole family moved en masse. It was in Skye that the brothers formed Runrig along with Blair Douglas and subsequently Donnie Munro.

MacDonald attended Jordanhill College and worked as a P.E. teacher until Runrig went 'professional'.

Later life
During the 1980s, MacDonald's Christian faith deepened and this influence began to be felt in his lyrical content, in both Gaelic and English. He was based in Edinburgh for the 1980s and early 1990s before re-locating his young family to Contin in the Highlands. MacDonald has contributed main vocals to a handful of Runrig tunes, including Dust and Faileas air an Airigh.

His son, Donald MacDonald - affectionately known as Seeds - is also a songwriter and performer and has his own band Donald MacDonald & the Islands.

References

External links
The Official Runrig website

People from Uist
20th-century Scottish male singers
Scottish percussionists
Scottish songwriters
Living people
1953 births
Runrig members
People educated at Portree High School
British male songwriters